Cava may refer to:

People

Sports
 José Luis Cabrera Cava (born 1982), a Spanish retired footballer
 Michela Cava, a Canadian-born women's ice hockey player
 Nicholas la Cava (born 1986), an American rower
 Tony LaCava (1961), an American professional baseball executive
 Zoran Dimitrijević (called Čav), (1962–2006), a Serbian professional footballer

Other people
 Florinda la Cava, legendary Spaniard who played a central role in the downfall of the Visigothic kingdom in 711
 John Cavas (1910–1993), a stuntman and actor in Hindi movies
 Paul Cava (born 1949), an American artist photographer
 Robert Cava (born 1951), an American solid-state chemist
 Stephanie LaCava, an American writer
 Osvaldo Cavandoli or Cava (1920–2007), an Italian cartoonist

Places

Italy
 Cava de' Tirreni, town and municipality of the province of Salerno, Italy
 Cava Manara, municipality of the province of Pavia, Italy
 Cava del Rivettazzo, a Sicel necropolis in Solarino, Italy
 Via cava, a road network linking the Etruscan necropolis Sovana, with neighboring villages in the province of Grosseto, Italy
 La Trinità della Cava (or Badia di Cava), a Benedictine abbey located near Cava de' Tirreni

Elsewhere
 Cava, Lleida, a municipality in the community of Catalonia, Spain
 Cava, Orkney, one of the Orkney Islands, Scotland
 Čavaš, a village in the municipality of Ravno, Bosnia and Herzegovina
 505 Cava, a main-belt asteroid
 Central America Volcanic Arc (CAVA), a chain of volcanoes on the Pacific Coast of Central America
 Mottone di Cava, a mountain in Ticino, Switzerland

Arts, entertainment, and media
 CaVa Studios, a professional recording studio in Glasgow, Scotland
 La Cava (musical), 1995 musical from the book Florinda by Dana Broccoli
 La Cava Bible, a Latin illuminated Bible

Education
 California Virtual Academies (CAVA), a virtual public charter school located in California, United States
 Chamarajendra Academy of Visual Arts (CAVA), a visual art school of India

Science
 Cava, an extinct genus of cyclostome Bryozoan
 Corydalis cava, a flowering plant
 Venae cavae, the veins (inferior and superior) that return blood to the heart

Wine
 Cava (Greek wine), a Greek wine of type Epitrapezios Oinos
 Cava (Spanish wine), a Spanish sparkling wine
 Cava Winery & Vineyard, a winery in New Jersey

Other uses
 Cava Group, an American restaurant chain
 S.S. Cavese 1919, an Italian football club based in Cava de' Tirreni

See also
 Cave (disambiguation)
 Gava (disambiguation)
 Kava (disambiguation)
 La Cava (disambiguation)